Stefan Đorđević (born 10 September 1990) is a Montenegrin footballer, who most recently played for Petrovac.

External links 
 

1990 births
Living people
Association football forwards
Montenegrin footballers
OFK Petrovac players
FK Mogren players
FK Lovćen players
OFK Grbalj players
FK Jedinstvo Bijelo Polje players
FK Vojvodina players
Montenegrin First League players
Serbian SuperLiga players
Montenegrin expatriate footballers
Expatriate footballers in Serbia
Montenegrin expatriate sportspeople in Serbia